Filippo Baroncini (born 16 August 2000) is an Italian cyclist, who currently rides for UCI WorldTeam .

Major results

2018
 3rd Road race, National Junior Road Championships
2019
 4th Trofeo Città di Brescia
2020
 1st Vicenza–Bionde
 5th Trofeo Città di San Vendemiano
2021
 UCI Road World Under-23 Championships
1st  Road race
9th Time trial
 National Under-23 Road Championships
1st  Time trial
2nd Road race
 1st Stage 4 (ITT) Giro Ciclistico d'Italia
 UEC European Under-23 Road Championships
2nd  Road race
7th Time trial
 3rd Overall L'Étoile d'or
1st Stage 2
 3rd Gran Premio Sportivi di Poggiana
 4th Coppa Sabatini
 6th Overall Giro della Regione Friuli Venezia Giulia
 9th Ruota d'Oro
 10th Piccolo Giro di Lombardia
2022
 National Road Championships
5th Road race
5th Time trial
 7th Overall Tour Poitou-Charentes en Nouvelle-Aquitaine

References

External links

2000 births
Living people
Italian male cyclists
People from Massa Lombarda
Cyclists from Emilia-Romagna
Sportspeople from the Province of Ravenna